This is an alphabetical listing of cities and countries that have commuter or suburban railways that are currently operational and in service. Commuter and suburban rail systems are train services that connect city centres with outer suburbs or nearby cities, with most passengers traveling for work or school. Unlike metros or light rail these systems usually operate on main line tracks unsegregated from other rail traffic. They differ from regional rail in that they usually have a hub-and-spoke paradigm and are focused on moving large number of passengers to a central business district.

List

See also

 Lists of rapid transit systems
 List of metro systems
 List of tram and light rail transit systems
 List of town tramway systems
 List of monorail systems
 List of rail transit systems in the United States
 S-Bahn
 List of airport people mover systems
 List of funicular railways
 List of trolleybus systems
 List of bus rapid transit systems
 List of premetro systems

Notes

References

Suburban and commuter rail systems
Passenger rail transport